Thiru Aarattu Madannada is a Lord Siva's temple in Kollam district. The temple is situated in Mylakkadu. The temple is located on the National Highway 47 between Chathannur and Kottiyam near Mylakkad. In the ancient temple, Lord Shiva resides under a pine tree. The festival of this temple is well known in the Kollam district as it has a history of centuries.

Uchara Maholsavam
Uchara Maholsavam is one of the famous Festival day in Kerala especially in Kollam district.

uchara maholsavam is considered as half of onam on Makaram 28. It is a traditional festival in the temple. Thirumudi ezhunnallath is  the main attraction of uchara. On this occasion the priest of the temple who carries the jewels and with a valuable hat on the head starts his walk on bare foot from Peringapuram.

Way to the Temple
You can reach here via Mylakkadu and Ithikkara. Kollam Junction railway station  and Paravur Railway Station are the nearest railway stations.

References

More details :
   Facebook :https://www.facebook.com/mylakkadumadannada/

Blog : http://mylakkadumadannada.blogspot.in

Hindu temples in Kollam district